Houghton Mill is a water mill located on the Great Ouse in the village of Houghton, Cambridgeshire, England. It is a National Trust property and a Grade II* listed building.

History

Mills have been recorded here since 974. The mill was owned by the nearby Ramsey Abbey from its foundation. The abbey's tenants were under an obligation to have their wheat ground in the mill and part of the flour was withheld as payment by the miller. When in 1500 the Abbot diverted the river water in order to supply the mill with sufficient power, the neighbouring village was flooded. The villagers rose up in protest, and fifteen years later they were granted permission to change the course of the water in case of an emergency.

At the Dissolution of the Monasteries, ownership of the mill reverted to the Crown.  The present mill replaces one burnt down in  the 17th century.

The best-known miller was the  nonconformist Potto Brown  (1797–1871), a wealthy man who was so pious that he carried his ledgers to family prayer meetings in order to discuss with his Maker debts owed him. After his death, a bronze bust of him was erected in Houghton.

The present building
Although there has been a mill on this site for most of Houghton's history, the original mill site (certainly in the time of the Domesday book) was approximately 0.4 miles along the river towards Huntingdon. The original mill pond is still there but now appears to be a natural backwater.

The present building was probably built in the 17th century, and extended in the 19th century. It consists of three storeys and attics. the building is part brick, part timber-framed and weather-boarded.

In the 1930s, the mill was decommissioned. Local residents bought the building and it was given to the National Trust. From 1935 to 1983, the mill was in use as a youth hostel, and was one of the few YHA establishments where smoking was forbidden because of fire hazard.

In 1999, the National Trust put in new millstones. Flour is still being milled, and the building is now a tourist attraction, with a camping site nearby.

See also
Christopher Biden

References

External links
Houghton Mill information at the National Trust

National Trust properties in Cambridgeshire
Tourist attractions in Cambridgeshire
Grade II* listed buildings in Cambridgeshire
Watermills in Cambridgeshire
Museums in Cambridgeshire
Mill museums in England
Youth hostels in England and Wales